The Ndwandwe are a Bantu Nguni-speaking people who populate sections of southern Africa.

The Ndwandwe, with the Mthethwa, were a significant power in present-day Zululand at the turn of the nineteenth century. Under the leadership of King Zwide, the Ndwandwe nation destroyed the Mthethwa under their king Dingiswayo, and the power vacuum was filled by Shaka Zulu and the Zulu tribe. In a common front against the Ndwandwe, Shaka collected the remains of the Mthethwa and other regional tribes, and survived the first encounter of the Zulu Civil War with Zwide at the Battle of Gqokli Hill in 1818. 

In 1819, Nkambule made another expedition against the Zulus, but Shaka again changed his tactics, letting the Ndwandwe army penetrate his territory and responding with guerrilla warfare. Shortage of supplies caused the Ndandwe to return home, but when they were crossing the river Mhlatuze in early 1820, their forces were split and defeated at the Battle of Mhlatuze River.

This led to the disintegration of the Ndwandwe nation as Zwide's generals and sons led sections of the Ndwandwe northwards. One such group, under Soshangane, formed the Gaza Empire in present-day central Mozambique while another, under Zwangendaba, established rule as the waNgoni in present-day Malawi. Others established themselves as chiefs of note in Eswatini and Zambia to create a Ndwandwe legacy of enduring power that is scattered across Southern Africa.

They speak Nguni dialects and their nations’ official languages are English in Zambia and Zimbabwe, and Portuguese in Mozambique.

See also
Ndwandwe–Zulu War
Battle of Gqokli Hill
History of South Africa
Military history of South Africa
Battle of Mhlatuze River

Nguni
History of KwaZulu-Natal
Monarchies of South Africa